Sandro is an Italian, Portuguese, Spanish, Swiss, Georgian and Croatian given name, often a diminutive of Alessandro or Alexander. It is also a surname. 

Sandro may refer to:

Given name or nickname

Sports
Sandro (footballer, born 1973), Brazilian footballer Sandro Chaves de Assis Rosa
Sandro (footballer, born 1974), Brazilian footballer Carlos Alejandro Sierra Fumero
Sandro (footballer, born 1980), Brazilian footballer Sandro Cardoso dos Santos
Sandro (footballer, born 1981), Brazilian footballer Alexsandro Oliveira Duarte
Sandro (footballer, born March 1983), Brazilian footballer Sandro Luiz da Silva
Sandro (footballer, born October 1983), Brazilian footballer Sandro da Silva Mendonça
Sandro (footballer, born 1986), Brazilian footballer Sandro José Ferreira da Silva
Sandro (footballer, born February 1987), Brazilian footballer Sandro Costa da Silva
Sandro (footballer, born March 1987), Brazilian footballer Alessandro Ferreira Leonardo
Sandro (footballer, born 1988), Brazilian footballer Sandro Silva de Souza
Sandro (footballer, born 1989), Brazilian footballer Sandro Raniere Guimarães Cordeiro
Sandro Alfaro (born 1971), Costa Rican former footballer
Sandro Bellucci (born 1955), Italian retired race walker
Sandro Burki (born 1985), Swiss footballer
Sandro Casamonica (born 1969), Italian boxer
Sandro Ceppolino (born 1974), Argentine-born Italian rugby union coach and former player
Sandro Cois (born 1972), Italian retired footballer
Sandro Continenza (1920–1996), Italian screenwriter
Sandro Cortese (born 1990), German motorcycle racer
Sandro Dias (born 1975), Brazilian skateboarder
Sandro Djurić (born 1994), Austrian footballer
Sandro Ehrat (born 1991), Swiss tennis player
Sandro Floris (born 1965), Italian retired sprinter
Sandro Forner (born 1970), Brazilian football coach and former player
Sandro Gamba (born 1932), Italian former basketball player and coach
Sandro Gaúcho (born 1974), Brazilian former footballer
Sandro Goiano (born 1973), Brazilian footballer
Sandro Gotal (born 1991), Austrian footballer
Sandro Hiroshi (born 1979), Japanese-Brazilian footballer
Sandro Iashvili (born 1985), Georgian footballer
Sandro Lombardi (born 1986), Swiss footballer
Sandro Lopopolo (1939–2014), Italian boxer
Sandro Mamukelashvili (born 1999), American-born Georgian basketball player
Sandro Manoel (born 1988), Brazilian footballer
Alessandro Melli (born 1969), Italian retired footballer
Sandro Mendes (born 1977), retired footballer from Cape Verde
Sandro Munari (born 1940), Italian former motor racing and rally driver
Alessandro Nannini (born 1959), Italian retired racing driver
Sandro Nicević (born 1976), Croatian basketball player
Sandro Puppo (1918–1986), Italian football player and manager
Sandro Ramírez (born 1995), Spanish footballer
Sandro Salvioni (born 1953), Italian football manager and former player
Sandro Schwarz (born 1978), German football manager and former player
Sandro Silva (born 1984), Brazilian footballer
Sandro Sirigu (born 1988), Italian-German footballer
Sandro Stielicke (born 1986), German skeleton racer
Sandro Sukno (born 1990), Croatian water polo player
Alexander Todua (born 1987), Georgian rugby union player
Sandro Tomaš (born 1972), Croatian medley swimmer
Sandro Tonali (born 2000), Italian footballer
Sandro Trolliet (born 1988), Swiss curler
Sandro Viana (born 1977), Brazilian sprinter
Sandro Viletta (born 1986), Swiss alpine skier and 2014 Olympic gold medalist
Sandro Wagner (born 1987), German footballer

Arts and entertainment
Sandro Angiolini (1920–1985), Italian comics creator
Sandro Bocola (born 1931), Italian writer and artist
Sandro Bolchi (1924–2005), Italian director, actor and journalist
Sandro Botticelli (c. 1445–1510), Italian painter
Sandro Caldini, Italian oboe player
Sandro Corsaro, American animator and author
Sandro Ghenzi, Italian film producer in the 1940s and '50s
Sandro Key-Åberg (1922–1991), Swedish poet and novelist

Other
Sandro Bondi (born 1959), Italian politician
Sandro Mareco (born 1987), Argentine chess grandmaster
Sandro Mariátegui Chiappe (1921–2013), Prime Minister of Peru in 1984
Sandro Pertini (1896–1990), Italian journalist and socialist politician, seventh President of the Italian Republic
Sandro Pignatti (born 1930), Italian botanist
Sandro Rosa do Nascimento (1978–2000), perpetrator of the Bus 174 hostage crisis
Sandro Ruotolo (born 1955), Italian journalist and politician
Sandro Veronesi (writer) (born 1959), Italian writer
Alessandro Faedo (1913–2001), Italian mathematician and politician

Stage name
Sandro de América, Argentine singer and actor Roberto Sánchez-Ocampo (1945–2010)

Fictional characters
Sandro, chief antagonist in the video game Heroes of Might and Magic III: The Shadow of Death

Surname
Alex Sandro (born 1991), Brazilian footballer
Corsi Sandro, Italian engineer
Marlon Sandro (born 1977), Brazilian mixed martial artist

See also
Sandra (given name)
Sander (name)
Sondra
Alessandro
Alexander 
Alejandro

Lists of people by nickname
Italian masculine given names